A pinch valve is a full bore or fully ported type of control valve which uses a pinching effect to obstruct fluid flow.

Operating principle 
Pinch valves employ an elastic tubing (sleeve/hose) and a device that directly contacts the tubing (body). Forcing the tubing together will create a seal that is equivalent to the tubing's permeability.

Air-operated pinch valves consist of an elasticised reinforced rubber hose, a type of housing, and two socket end covers (or flanges). 
In air-operated pinch valves, the rubber hoses are usually press-fitted and centered into the housing ends by the socket covers. There is no additional actuator, the valve closes as soon as there is a pressurized air supply into the body. When the air supply becomes interrupted and the volume of air exhausts, the elastic rubber hose starts to open due to the force of the process flow.

Fields of application 

Pinch valves are typically used in applications where the media needs to be completely isolated from any internal valve parts. The sleeve will contain the flow media and isolate it from the environment hence reducing contamination. 
They are commonly applied to medical instruments, clinical or chemical analyzers, and a wide range of laboratory equipment.

Pinch valves are also used for slurries or processes with entrained solids, because the flexible rubber sleeve closes droptight around solids. This avoids entrapment by the seat or in crevices, which would happen if using globe, diaphragm, butterfly, gate or ball valves. 

Major industries that use pinch valves are:
 Bulk and solids handling,
 Cement industry,
 Waste water industry,
 Chemical industry,
 Food industry,
 Beverage industry,
 Ceramic-/Glass-/Plastic industry

On a smaller scale, pinch valves are used in some water pistols, notably the original Super Soaker 50.

Advantages
The most important benefits of using pinch valves are the full bore for the flow media, and 100% tight shut off – even on solids such as granules, powders, pellets, chippings, fibres, slivers, any kind of slurries and aggressive products.

Ball valves, piston valves or gate valves could fail when in contact with aggressive products, due to body seat or the gate/piston wearing out too quickly. Air-operated pinch valves work with less wear of the elastic rubber hose because the kinetic energy of the solids are absorbed through the high elasticity of the rubber that also helps to resist abrasion.

Material selection 

The sleeve material is selected among suitable synthetic polymer based upon the corrosiveness and abrasiveness of the flow media. 
A key selection criterion is the operation temperature, which needs to be within the limit of the polymer.

Several rubber qualities are available for pinch valves such as natural rubber, EPDM, nitrile, viton, neoprene and butyl.
Different housings and end covers/flange materials such as aluminium, plastics and stainless steel are also available;

References 

Valves